Death of Félix Louis L'Herminier
Samuel Tickell describes new birds from India in the Journal of The Asiatic Society of Bengal. These include the jungle owlet, Tickell's thrush and the thick-billed flowerpecker.
Richard Owen dissects a specimen of a great hornbill noting highly pneumatized bones, with hollow air cavities extending to the tips of their wing bones.
Brian Houghton Hodgson becomes British Resident in Kathmandu
William Jardine unites the hermit hummingbirds in a new subfamily the Phaethornithinae
Death of René Louiche Desfontaines
Prince Maximilian of Wied-Neuwied expedition to  the Interior of North America. One of the birds discovered was the pinyon jay.
Constantin Wilhelm Lambert Gloger theorises that dark pigments increase in races of animals living in warm and humid habitats in a work entitled Das Abändern der Vögel durch Einfluss des Klima's 

Birding and ornithology by year
1833 in science